Desert Dolphin Skatepark was constructed as a part of the Netflix original film Skater Girl and is now a free public skatepark located in Khempur, Rajasthan.

Construction
As the central set of the film Skater Girl, the filmmakers decided to build Rajasthan's first and one of India's largest skateparks in Khempur, Rajasthan.

The skatepark was built in 45 days over 8 weeks during a challenging monsoon season. The Park spans over 14,500 sq.ft and is situated on a one acre campus. The park was built and is managed by the Makijany Sisters.

The skatepark was built in partnership with Holystoked and 100Ramps Construction Company and is now run as a free community skatepark.

Social impact
The social impact of skateboarding continues to positively influence the children of the local villages. The training and the access to a world class facility enabled four rural skaters, who had never stepped on a skateboard before the park was built, to represent Rajasthan in the National Skateboarding Championship in Chandigarh, April 2021. The Desert Dolphin Skatepark continues to impact the lives of children through the many workshops, training and resident volunteers.

References

External links
 

Skateboarding
Skateparks
Sport in Rajasthan
Sport in Udaipur
Sports venues in Udaipur